Enterprise Products Partners L.P. is an American midstream natural gas and crude oil pipeline company with headquarters in Houston, Texas.
It acquired GulfTerra in September 2004. The company ranked No. 105 in the 2018 Fortune 500 list of the largest United States corporations by total revenue. Dan Duncan was the majority owner until his death in 2010.

History

In 2005, Ralph S. Cunningham became CEO of Enterprise Products Partners.

On July 23, 2007, Cunningham replaced Michael A. Creel as president and CEO of the affiliated Enterprise GP Holdings LP. Cunningham had earlier been named interim president and CEO, and resigned from the Enterprise Products CEO position effective July 31, 2007. Creel then became president and CEO of the company's general partner Enterprise Products Partners L.P.

Cunningham also became a director of both Enterprise GP Holdings and affiliated Duncan Energy Partners LP.

Enterprise Products acquired Enterprise GP Holdings in 2010.

Incidents
On June 7, 2005, during replacement of an Enterprise Products pipeline pigging facility in Mirando City, Texas, HVL gases leaked past a stopple. The gases were ignited by a nearby air compressor, killing one of the repair crew.

On February 8, 2011, a series of explosions destroyed much of a Mont Belvieu facility owned and operated by Enterprise Products.  The ensuing fire was controlled after two hours.  One contractor at the plant was not accounted for, however no other injuries were reported.

On December 27, 2011, controllers for Enterprise Products received an alarm, for a leak on an LPG pipeline. The leak location was found in Loving County, Texas. Repair crew excavated the area, and found a full girth weld failure. During the pipeline repair, a flash fire involving residual pipeline product in the soil occurred the next day, injuring 3 employees, one of whom required in-patient hospitalization. The rupture was attributed to the complete circumferential separation of an acetylene girth weld dating to 1928, and the flash fire was attributed to operator error.

On January 26, 2015, a 20-inch Enterprise Products ATEX pipeline carrying ethane exploded and burned in Brooke County, West Virginia. Despite snow in the area, five acres of woodlands burned, and 1,283,000 gallons of ethane were consumed, or lost. The fireball melted siding on nearby homes and damaged power lines; it is believed that day's snowy weather lessened the damage. Reports suspect a girth weld failure from ductile tensile overload, with the pipeline being less than two years old. There were no injuries.

On December 1, 2015, personnel from Enterprise discovered a spill at their West Cushing Tank Farm, in Cushing, Oklahoma. Approximately 42,000 gallons of crude oil were released within the terminal. A tank line had failed from internal corrosion.

On November 29, 2016, an Enterprise Products pipeline exploded in Platte County, Missouri, burning about 210,000 gallons of an ethane propane mixture. There were no evacuations or injuries. The cause of the failure was stress corrosion cracking.

On January 30, 2017, a road crew punctured the Seaway S-1 crude oil pipeline in Texas, which is jointly joined by Enterprise Products Partners and the Canadian Enbridge Inc. through the joint venture Seaway Crude Pipeline Company. Two days later, it was unclear how much oil had spilled over the nearby Highway 121 northeast of Dallas. After the incident, supply concerns reportedly helped push "oil prices 2% higher in early trading to nearly $54 a barrel.

On December 6, 2017, an Enterprise Products pipeline exploded around 1:30 am near Loving, in southeast New Mexico. Eddy County officials asked residents within a 2-mile radius of the intersection of U.S. Highway 285 and State Road 31 to voluntarily evacuate.

On August 21, 2020, a dredging vessel hit a submerged Enterprise Products propane pipeline, in the harbor of Corpus Christi, Texas, causing an explosion and fire. Five of the crew were killed, and, six others were injured.

Assets 
According to the company website and their regulatory fillings, it has the following assets:

Pipelines 
 of pipelines, including:
 NGL Pipelines & Services:  of natural gas liquids pipelines
 Onshore Natural Gas Pipelines & Services:  of natural gas pipelines
 Onshore Crude Oil Pipelines & Services:  of onshore crude oil pipelines
 Offshore Pipelines & Services:  of Gulf of Mexico natural gas and crude oil pipelines
 Propylene Pipelines:  of propylene pipelines in Texas and Louisiana.

Storage (salt dome) 
  of NGL storage capacity 
  of natural gas storage capacity

Marine Terminals 
 NGL Import/Export Terminals on the Houston Ship Channel
 Import: unload up to 8,100 Bbls/hr
 Export: load up to 10,000 Bbls/hr

Fractionation 
 19 NGL and propylene fractionators 
 NGL: nine plants, with a net capacity of approximately 439 Mbpd
 Propylene: two facilities, with a net capacity of approximately 87 Mbpd 
 Isomerization: three plants, with a net capacity of approximately 116 Mbpd

Natural gas processing 
 26 plants, with a net processing capacity of 6.3 Bcf/day

References

External links

 
 Enterprise Product System Map

Companies based in Houston
Companies listed on the New York Stock Exchange
Natural gas companies of the United States
Natural gas pipeline companies
Oil companies of the United States
Oil pipeline companies